The Te'mexw Treaty Association handles Treaty negotiations in the BC Treaty Process for a number of First Nations located in the northern Strait of Georgia of British Columbia.  The members of the association are former signatories of the Douglas Treaties, a group of treaties signed in the 1850s.

Treaty Process

The Treaty group has reached Stage 5 in the BC Treaty Process.

Membership

See also
List of tribal councils in British Columbia

References

First Nations organizations in British Columbia
Southern Vancouver Island